Dash Bolagh (also Romanized as Dāsh Bolāgh and Dāshbolāgh; also known as Dash-Bulag and Dāshbulāq) is a village in Yurchi-ye Sharqi Rural District, Kuraim District, Nir County, Ardabil Province, Iran. At the 2006 census, its population was 62, in 10 families.

References 

Towns and villages in Nir County